In Greek mythology, Hippotion (Ancient Greek: Ἱπποτίων) may refer to the following individuals:

 Hippotion, one of the Centaurs who lived on the Pholoe mountain in Arcadia. Once he smelled the sweet odor of the wine coming from the cave of Pholus, he went there with many other Centaurs, armed with stones and pine trees. As soon as they stormed into the cave, however, they were met by the furious Heracles, who was visiting Pholus at that time. The hero engaged into battle with the Centaurs and driven away a large number of them with burning torches. The other Centaurs who cannot escape, including Hippotion, were all killed by Heracles.
Hippotion, a resident of Ascania in Phrygia and father of the Trojan warrior Morys. When they attacked the Greek fleet, he was killed by Meriones, one of the leaders of the Cretan troops, during the tenth year of the Trojan War.

Notes

References 

 Diodorus Siculus, The Library of History translated by Charles Henry Oldfather. Twelve volumes. Loeb Classical Library. Cambridge, Massachusetts: Harvard University Press; London: William Heinemann, Ltd. 1989. Vol. 3. Books 4.59–8. Online version at Bill Thayer's Web Site
 Diodorus Siculus, Bibliotheca Historica. Vol 1–2. Immanel Bekker. Ludwig Dindorf. Friedrich Vogel. in aedibus B. G. Teubneri. Leipzig. 1888–1890. Greek text available at the Perseus Digital Library.
 Homer, The Iliad with an English Translation by A.T. Murray, Ph.D. in two volumes. Cambridge, MA., Harvard University Press; London, William Heinemann, Ltd. 1924. . Online version at the Perseus Digital Library.
 Homer, Homeri Opera in five volumes. Oxford, Oxford University Press. 1920. . Greek text available at the Perseus Digital Library.

Achaeans (Homer)
People of the Trojan War
Centaurs
Mythology of Heracles